Beaux Collins (born December 16, 2002) is an American football wide receiver for the Clemson Tigers.

High school career 
Collins attended St. John Bosco High School in Bellflower, California. At St. John Bosco, he was teammates with future Clemson Tigers quarterback DJ Uiagalelei. As a junior, Collins recorded 41 catches for 1,008 yards and 14 touchdowns. A four-star recruit, Collins committed to play college football at Clemson University, enrolling early.

College career 
Collins started his first career game against Pitt. He finished the season with 31 receptions for 407 yards and three touchdowns. During his sophomore season, Collins tallied 20 catches and 308 yards while leading the team in touchdown receptions with five. He would suffer a season ending shoulder injury against South Carolina.

References

External links 

 Clemson Tigers bio

Living people
Players of American football from Los Angeles
American football wide receivers
Clemson Tigers football players
2002 births